The Grimming (2,351 m) is an isolated peak in the Dachstein Mountains of Austria and one of the few ultra-prominent mountains of the Alps.

Geography

Location 
The Grimming rises between the Enns valley and Salzkammergut, east of the Dachstein massif, being separated from its eastern rim by the Salza Gorge.

Geology 

Despite its topographical separation from the Dachstein, the Grimming is mainly made of Dachstein limestone and is, in effect, a slab of the Dachstein block that has broken off.

Southwest of the main summit is the Grimmingtor, a roughly 50-metre-high and 15-metre-wide recess in the rock face, capped by a 10-metre-thick rock overhang. To the east it is bounded by a large rib of rock, which is why, in certain light conditions, it has the appearance of a gate (German: Tor). According to legend, rich treasures have been hidden behind this "gate".

History 
Thanks to its imposing appearance, it was long described as mons Styriae altissimus, the highest mountain in the Austrian state of Styria.

Very early on the Grimming was used as a survey mark for land survey. In 1822 Lieutenant Carl Baron Simbschen erected a wooden survey mark at the summit and a stone hut just below it as a shelter.

Access 
The mountain is a popular destination for mountaineers and climbers.

Huts 
 Grimming Hut (966 m): The only hut in this massif is not far above the valley and may be reached in about an hour from Trautenfels.
 North of the Grimming summit there is a bothy that was built in 1949 and may be used as emergency shelter in bad weather.

Ascents 
 From Trautenfels through the Schneegrube (southeast): most popular route via the Grimming Hut. This route was first used in 1888 by Heinrich Heß.
 From Kulm (northwest): starting behind the ski jump, through the cirque of Gipfelkar, where the bothy is located.
 From Trautenfels via Kasten and Multereck: this route initially crosses the eastern subpeak (2,176 m), before reaching the main summit.
 From Niederstuttern to the Grimming Hut, then left along the southeast arête or right via Kasten and Multereck to the top.

Gallery

See also
List of Alpine peaks by prominence

References

Literature 
 Paula Grogger: Das Grimmingtor. Literarische Aufarbeitung der Sagen rund um den Grimming. .

External links

 Grimming-Info 
 Livecam
"Grimming, Austria" on Peakbagger

Mountains of the Alps
Two-thousanders of Austria
Mountains of Styria